Thiri Thudhamma (Arakanese:သီရိသုဓမ္မ; whose personal name was Min Hari (မင်းဟရီ), also known as Salim Shah II was a king of the Mrauk-U Dynasty of Arakan.

Reign
During Thudhamma's rule of Arakan, Muhammad Khurram (later Shah Jahan) took control of neighbouring Mughal Bengal in 1624. Thudamma took advantage of the Bengal crisis by leading a raid into Bhalwa (Noakhali), where he defeated the local administrator Mirza Baqi and returned to Arakan with plenty of war booty.

Thudhamma's commanding officer was Ashraf Khan, a devoted Sufi Muslim and the patron of renowned Bengali poet Daulat Qazi.

References

Bibliography
 
 
 
 

Monarchs of Mrauk-U
17th century in Burma
17th-century Burmese monarchs